Henry Banyenzaki is a Ugandan politician who served as the elected Member of Parliament for Rubanda County West, Kabale District. From 2011 to 2016, he served as the State Minister for Economic Monitoring in the Office of the President in the Cabinet of Uganda.

Background and educations
He was born in Kabale District on 27 March 1967. He attended local primary and secondary schools. In 1988, he received a Diploma in Environmental Studies from Makerere University. In 1991, he was awarded a Bachelor of Arts in social sciences. In 2005, he received a Master of Arts degree in planning & management, also from Makerere University. Banyenzaki also received a Diploma in Accounting from the Association of Professional Accountancy Studies in 1988. His Certificate in Microfinance for Non Specialists was obtained in 2003 from the World Bank Group.

Career
From 1995 to 1997, he worked as an assistant marketing and sales manager at Uganda Aluminium Limited, a private enterprise in Kampala, Uganda's capital city. In 1998, he was promoted to marketing manager at the same company. From 2000 until 2001, he worked as the business development manager at Tororo Cement Limited. In 2001, he won the parliamentary seat of Rubanda County West, in Kabale District, and was re-elected in 2006, 2011 and 2016.

He was appointed as State Minister for Economic Monitoring in the Office of the President on 27 May 2011. In the cabinet reshuffle of 1 March 2015, he retained his cabinet post before being replaced in June 2016.

He is a member of the National Resistance Movement political party.

Personal life
He was married on 3rd August 1996 and has 3 children with has wife.

See also
Kabale
Government of Uganda

References

External links
 Full of List of Ugandan Cabinet Ministers May 2011

Living people
1967 births
Government ministers of Uganda
Members of the Parliament of Uganda
National Resistance Movement politicians
Makerere University alumni
People from Rubanda District
People from Western Region, Uganda
21st-century Ugandan politicians